Literature and Revolution is a classic work of literary criticism from the Marxist standpoint written by Leon Trotsky in 1924. By discussing the various literary trends that were around in Russia between the revolutions of 1905 and 1917 Trotsky analyzed the concrete forces in society, both progressive as well as reactionary, that helped shape the consciousness of writers at the time.

In the book, Trotsky also argued that since the dawn of civilization art had always borne the stamp of the ruling class and was primarily a vehicle that expressed its tastes and its sensibilities. Nonetheless, he went on to argue against the seemingly obvious conclusion that after a proletarian revolution the proletariat as a ruling class should, therefore, strive to create its own proletarian art as many at the time thought.

To illustrate this he points out that the bourgeoisie as a class had time and resources to form its own culture way before the bourgeois revolutions in Europe in the 19th century while the proletariat by its position in society is deprived not only of culture but primarily the material means to attain it. Therefore, unlike previous revolutions in history the proletariat takes power not to install itself as a ruling class forever and hence create its own distinct culture but to create a society in which the existence of classes is materially impossible. Therefore, the task of the proletariat in power with respect to art after seeing to the more pressing needs of daily life (one must not forget Russia was a war-torn backward country) is to assimilate all the cultural achievements of the past and lay the foundations for a truly classless and human culture and art in the future. Trotsky's conviction of the heights human beings can reach once the fetters of oppression are thrown asunder is illustrated by the following quote from the book:

See also
 List of books by Leon Trotsky

Footnotes

Literature 
 Борев Ю. Эстетика Троцкого (in Russian) // Литература и революция / Л. Троцкий. — печатается по изд. 1923 г. — М.: Политиздат, 1991. — 399 с. — .
 Thatcher I. D. Trotsky's Dialectic // Studies in Soviet Thought. — 1991. — March (vol. 41, iss. 2). — P. 127—144.

External links
 Literature and Revolution on marxists.org, translated by Rose Strunsky Lorwin

Communist books
1924 non-fiction books
Works by Leon Trotsky
Books of literary criticism
Books about revolutions